Dalbandin Railway Station (Balochi: دالبدین ریلوے اسٹیشن ) is located in Dalbandin, Balochistan, Pakistan.

See also
 List of railway stations in Pakistan
 Pakistan Railways

References

External links

Railway stations on Quetta–Taftan Railway Line
Railway stations in Chaghi District
Railway stations in Balochistan, Pakistan